Muhammad al-Zanati is a Libyan politician who was the General Secretary of the General People's Congress, and the head of state of Libya from 18 January 1992 until 3 March 2008. He was reappointed on 1 March 2000. He is of the Qadhadhfa branch of the Houara tribe.

References 

Living people
1937 births
Heads of state of Libya
Secretaries-General of the General People's Congress